Beautiful Life is the 2006 fourth album from Canadian artist Bruce Guthro. The album produced the singles "Beautiful Life", "Montreal", "Holy Road" and "Touch".

Track listing
 "Beautiful Life" – 3:11
 "Wait" – 3:15
 "Touch" – 3:25
 "Come To Life" – 3:01
 "Montreal" – 3:49
 "Holy Road" – 3:56
 "Here For You" – 4:01
 "Full Blown Star" – 3:07
 "Be Still" – 4:10
 "Again" – 3:32
 "Gwyneth's Song" – 4:00
 "Jerusalem" – 2:39
 "Someone" – 5:57

Personnel
 Dave Burton – drums
 Kim Dunn – piano, keyboards, wurlitzer
 David Francey – background vocals
 Jamie Gatti – bass
 Great Big Sea – background vocals
 Bruce Guthro – guitar, composer, vocals
 Trine Mikkelsen – viola
 Chris Mitchell – flute, soprano saxophone
 Jamie Robinson – guitar, mandolin, electric guitar

and
 Christopher Mitchell – assistant engineer
 Martin Dam Kristensen – photography

External links
 

2006 albums
Bruce Guthro albums
Albums produced by Malcolm Burn
EMI Records albums